A Summer Tale is a 2000 comedy-drama. Its original Swedish title is Den bästa sommaren, which means "The Best Summer". Written and directed by Ulf Malmros, the film stars Kjell Bergqvist, Rebecca Scheja, Cecilia Nilsson, and Brasse Brännström, and was produced by Zentropa and Memfis Film.

Plot
The film takes place in 1958 in Molkom, where two children, Mårten from Stockholm and Annika from Uppsala, will be "summer children" to Yngve Johansson, who every summer takes children to his home, but it has been bad earlier years. In the beginning Mårten and Annika don't like Yngve, but they love each other more and more and they also start liking Yngve. Maybe he isn't as bad as they think? This summer'll move everything in their life for all future.

Cast
Kjell Bergqvist as Yngve Johansson
Anastasios Soulis as Mårten
Rebecca Scheja as Annika
Cecilia Nilsson as Miss Svanström
Brasse Brännström as Sven
Marcus Hasselborg as Harald, Sven's son
Gachugo Makini as Jacques
Göran Thorell as Erik Olsson, man working for Barnavårdsnämnden
Ann Petrén as Mrs Ljungström
Eivin Dahlgren as Headwaiter
Anna Kristina Kallin as Doctor
Ralph Carlsson as Priest
Jerker Fahlström as Postman
Johan Holmberg as Policeman

Production
The film was shot at Björkås Herrgård in Vargön, Restad Gård in Vänersborg, Anten-Gräfsnäs Railway, in Upphärad and in Sjuntorp. It premiered (in Sweden) on 8 March 2000 and is recommended from 7 years.

External links
 

 

Films set in 1958
2000 films
Swedish comedy-drama films
Danish comedy-drama films
2000 comedy-drama films
Zentropa films
Films directed by Ulf Malmros
2000s Swedish-language films
2000s Swedish films